The 2012–2013 ABA season is the twelfth season of the American Basketball Association. The season began in late October 2012 and ended in March 2013.  They playoffs were held in April 2013 with Jacksonville Giants winning the final four tournament.

League Standings

These are the final league standings.  The standings come from USBasket.

Playoffs

Round 1&2
Colorado Kings defeat Texas FUEL, 137-129
Gulf Coast Flash defeat Jackson Showboats, 144-114
Jersey Express defeat Richmond Rockets, 115-107
Arizona Scorpions defeat Fresno Heat, 130-106
San Francisco Rumble defeat Arizona Scorpions, 121-112
Chicago Steam defeat Detroit Hoops, 133-88
Gainesville Heat defeat Electric City Lions, 130-113
Fayetteville Flight defeat Gainesville Heat, 130-119
Note:  Although listed as part of the playoffs, these games seem to have little relevancy to the rest of the playoffs.

Regional Finals
East
South Carolina Warriors defeat Bluff City Reign
Jersey Express defeat Chicago Steam
Final:South Carolina Warriors defeat Jersey Express
West
Colorado Kings defeat Arizona Scorpions
San Francisco Rumble defeat San Diego Surf
Final:  Colorado Kings defeat San Francisco Rumble

ABA Final Four
Jacksonville Giants defeat Colorado Kings 117-94
North Dallas Vandals defeat South Carolina Warriors 113-110
Finals
Jacksonville Giants defeat North Dallas Vandals in two games

References

American Basketball Association (2000–present) seasons
ABA